Madhuca sessilis is a tree in the family Sapotaceae. The specific epithet sessilis means "without stalk", referring to the leaves.

Description
The bark is greyish brown. Inflorescences bear two to three flowers.

Distribution and habitat
Madhuca sessilis is native to Sumatra, Singapore and Borneo. Its habitat is mixed dipterocarp forest.

References

sessilis
Trees of Sumatra
Trees of Singapore
Trees of Borneo
Plants described in 1906
Taxa named by Charles Baehni
Taxa named by George King (botanist)
Taxa named by James Sykes Gamble